The Letter of 59 (also known as the Memorial or Memorandum of 59) was an open letter signed by 66 (or 59 at first, hence the name) Polish intellectuals who protested against the changes of the Constitution of the People's Republic of Poland that were made by the communist party of Poland in 1975. Additional people signed the letter in January 1976.

The letter was closely related to the Helsinki Accords. On September 1, 1975 the Polish socialist government signed  "The Blue Book" of the OSCE (the Organization for Security and Co-operation in Europe) committing to, among other things, respect for human rights and refraining from the threat or use of force. Meanwhile, the new changes to the Polish constitution proposed by the Polish United Workers' Party after the Helsinki Accords, included new ideological clauses pronouncing and reaffirming the "steering role of the Party in the nation," the "socialist character of the nation," a "permanent and unbreakable alliance with the Soviet Union," and most of all, that the "government obligation to respect the rights of the citizens" is conditional only, and "dependent on the citizens fulfilling their obligations towards the country."

The communist government criticized the letter of protest publicly, with Edward Gierek calling the signatories "furious anticommunists, politically blind". Eventually, although the constitution was changed, the above fragments were redrafted to sound more neutral:
 the steering role of the Party "in the nation" was changed to "in the building of socialism"
 "alliance" with the USSR was replaced with "friendship"
 citizens' rights were not linked with their obligations

The government could not officially persecute the signatories for their letter, although various semi-official persecutions were implemented, for example, some authors had the government agencies refuse to print or distribute their books for several years thereafter.

Signatories 
Italics refer to the additional signatories from early 1976

Stefan Amsterdamski
Stanisław Barańczak
Ewa Bieńkowska
Jacek Bierezin
Henryk Błachnio
Irena Byrska
Tadeusz Byrski
Bohdan Chwedeńczuk
Ludwik Cohn
Andrzej Drawicz
Jerzy Ficowski
Kornel Filipowicz
Zbigniew Herbert
Ryszard Herczyński
Maryla Hopfinger
Zdzisław Jaroszewski
Anna Kamieńska
Jakub Karpiński
Wojciech Karpiński
Jan Kielanowski
Stefan Kisielewski
Jacek Kleyff

Leszek Kołakowski
Julian Kornhauser
Maria Komiłowicz
Mieczysław Kotlarczyk
Marcin Król
Ryszard Krynicki
Jacek Kuroń
 Stanisław Leśniewski
Edward Lipiński
Jan Józef Lipski
Zdzisław Łapiński
Hanna Malewska
ks. Stanisław Małkowski
Jerzy Markuszewski
Adam Mauersberger
Adam Michnik
Halina Mikołajska
Jan Nepomucen Miller
Ludwik Muzyczka
Zygmunt Mycielski
Jerzy Narbutt
Jan Olszewski

Antoni Pajdak
Krzysztof Pomian
Hanna Rudzka-Cybisowa
Józef Rybicki
o. Jacek Salij
Władysław Siła-Nowicki
Stanisław Skalski
Antoni Słonimski
Aniela Steinsbergowa
Julian Stryjkowski
Jan Józef Szczepański
Adam Szczypiorski
Kazimierz Szelągowski
Wisława Szymborska
Jacek Trznadel
Tadeusz Wojnarowski
Maria Wosiek
Adam Zagajewski
Wacław Zawadzki
Barbara Zbrożyna
ks. Jan Zieja
Wojciech Ziembiński

In addition in January 1976,  78 emigrants and exiled Polish intellectuals also signed the letter, including:

Adam Ciołkosz
Lidia Ciołkosz
Maria Danilewiczowa
Józef Garliński
Gustaw Herling-Grudziński

Jan Kott
Józef Łobodowski
Tadeusz Nowakowski
Edward Bernard Raczyński
Zofia Romanowiczowa

Tymon Terlecki
Wiktor Trościanko
Leopold Tyrmand
Józef Wittlin

Open letters
1975 in Poland
1975 documents